In France, the Tribunal des conflits is a court system charged with settling conflicts of jurisdiction between the two branches of the French legal system, judiciaire and administratif, and with preventing denials of justice born of conflicting decisions from the two branches.

The tribunal de conflicts may be called on to decide whether an administrative judge (Conseil d’État…) or a judiciary judge (Tribunal judiciaire, conseil de prud'hommes, Tribunal de Commerce…) should rule in a particular case, or sometimes to determine the solution to be applied when decisions from the two branches conflict.

Decisions of the Tribunal des conflits apply to all levels of the judiciary and administrative legal system and cannot be appealed.

The tribunal is said to be  paritaire, that is, made up of  equal numbers of conseillers d'État and of magistrates from the Cour de cassation.

The Tribunal des conflits sits at the Palais-Royal and is housed in the offices of the Conseil d'État.

References

Judiciary of France